This is a list of franchise records for the Anaheim Ducks of the National Hockey League.

Regular season

All players

Points

Goals

Assists

Games played

Penalty minutes

Game-winning goals

Power-play goals

Short-handed goals

Defensemen

Points

Goaltenders

Games played

Wins

Shutouts

Goals against average

*minimum 25 games played

Save percentage

*minimum 25 games played

Playoffs

All players

Points

Goals

Assists

Games played

Penalty minutes

Game-winning goals

Power play goals

Short-handed goals

Defensemen

Points

Goaltenders

Games played

Wins

Goals against average

*minimum 100 minutes played

Save percentage

*minimum 100 minutes played

Shutouts

Franchise records

Franchise single season 

 † Ties are no longer an official NHL statistic since the 2005–06 NHL season
 ‡ Overtime losses became an official NHL statistic in the 1999–2000 NHL season and replaced the 'tie' statistic beginning in the 2005–06 NHL season

Franchise single game

Franchise streaks

Streaks

Individual records

Career leaders 

 † At the end of the 2007–08 NHL season
 †† Minimum 50 games played
 ‡ Minimum 500 shots against

Single season leaders

Individual single game leaders

References

 Career Leaders of the Anaheim Ducks.
 
 

Records
National Hockey League statistical records